Eupterocerina conjuncta is a species of ulidiid or picture-winged fly in the genus Eupterocerina of the family Tephritidae.

References

Ulidiidae